Kirimanjeshwara  is a village in the southern state of Karnataka, India It is well known for  Shri Agasthyeshwara temple. It is located in the Byndoor taluk of Udupi district in Karnataka.

Demographics
As of 2011 India census, Kirimanjeshwara had a population of 7454 with 3353 males and 4101 females.

See also
 Byndoor
 Udupi
 Districts of Karnataka

References

External links
 http://Udupi.nic.in/

Villages in Udupi district